Exhibit B: The Human Condition is the ninth studio album by American thrash metal band Exodus. The album picks up after The Atrocity Exhibition... Exhibit A, continuing with long, epic songs (averaging around 6 minutes) with darker themes centered on war, death, society, politics and religion. It was released on May 7, 2010 in Europe and was released on May 18, 2010 in the United States. It debuted at number 114 on the Billboard 200. Additionally, Exhibit B was Exodus' first studio album since 1989's Fabulous Disaster not to feature a lineup change from the preceding album. It sold around 4,600 copies in its first week of release in the U.S. Exhibit B is Exodus' last album with vocalist Rob Dukes, who was fired in June 2014, although he was still part of the band when the songwriting sessions for Blood In, Blood Out began.

Cover art
Guitarist Gary Holt commented on the bands intentions for the album's cover: "We wanted to portray the violence of man at its finest, so we started with our own version of the Leonardo da Vinci sketch of Vitruvian Man, but done the 'EXODUS' way!  I was pointed in the direction of Colin Larks of Rainsong Design for the cover and he killed it!  To me, the artwork represents man and his affinity for bloodshed, ignorance, and all-around ability to be led like sheep to the slaughter.  The image fits the songs on this record perfectly.  The whole layout is going to be as sick as the record itself!"

Lyrical themes
The album displays a variety of lyrical themes, but is almost entirely focused on dark and depressing topics. Government is a recurring theme with "Downfall" describing the fall of major world governments through war and recession, and "March of the Sycophants" describing the hypocrisy of Christian conservatives. Some songs focus on tragic events such as the Nanking Massacre in "Nanking" and the killings carried out by Leonard Lake and Charles Ng in "The Ballad of Leonard and Charles".

Reception
Exhibit B: The Human Condition received positive reviews. Greg Prato from Allmusic said: "You can always count on Exodus to supply some good, old-fashioned, downright vicious thrash metal with each release. And the lads deliver once more on their 2010 offering, Exhibit B: The Human Condition (impressively, their fourth album over a six-year period -- 2004-2010), further describing it by saying - with the intensity not dipping one iota from beginning to end, and - Even with the tunes that momentarily take a breather ('Democide,' 'A Perpetual State of Indifference,' etc.), it's only a matter of time until Exodus rams down the gas pedal once again and returns to their chug-a-lug riffery. Exodus has always liked it fast and furious, and they certainly don't disappoint with Exhibit B: The Human Condition."

Track listing
All songs written by Gary Holt except where noted.

Personnel
Rob Dukes – vocals
Gary Holt – guitars
Lee Altus – guitars
Jack Gibson – bass
Tom Hunting – drums

Additional performers
Brendon Small – guitar solo on "Devil's Teeth"
Peter Tägtgren – backing vocals on "The Sun Is My Destroyer"
Raymond Anthony – keyboards on "The Ballad of Leonard and Charles", Additional guitar engineering

Production
Andy Sneap – producer/mixer

Charts

References

Exodus (American band) albums
2010 albums
Nuclear Blast albums
Albums produced by Andy Sneap